Balika Badhu is a 1967 Bengali film starring Moushumi Chatterjee (as balika badhu) and directed by Tarun Majumdar. The film was based on novel of same name by Bimal Kar. The film was remade in Hindi as same name in 1976 also directed by Majumdar.

Plot 

The movie is about child marriage, a custom that was prevalent amongst various Indian societies. Set during British Raj in India, the movie tells the story of a village school boy Amal, who is married to a younger girl named Rajni. Left together for a few days, as a part of the ritual, the two develop friendship and love. Shortly, Rajni must return to her parents’ house, while Amal continues with his studies at home with Masterji, an elderly teacher. His life is enlivened occasionally when Rajni is permitted to visit.

Though Rajni's next visit is scheduled for Durga Puja, she fails to make it. Instead, she arrives during Vijayadashami, to stay for a couple nights, before going on a proposed, long pilgrimage with her family. However, the British Police arrests Masterji for being a "freedom fighter", harboring and training fugitives, and making explosives. How this incident affects Amal and Rajni forms the rest of the story.

Cast
 Moushumi Chatterjee
 Partho Mukherjee
 Juin Banerjee
 Anubha Gupta
 Santosh Bandyopadhyay
 Prasad Mukherjee
 Anup Kumar
 Ruma Guha Thakurta
 Bankim Ghosh

Music
The songs used in the  film are:

1. Aaji Esechhi Aaji Esechhi (Written and composed by Dwijendralal Ray; sung by Robin Banerjee)

2. Aami Kusum Tuliya (Written by Gauriprasanna Mazumder; composed by Hemanta Mukherjee; sung by Bani Dasgupta and Hemanta Mukherjee)

3. Bhajo Gaurango Kaho Gaurango (Traditional song; sung by Hemanta Mukherjee)

4. Chhere Dao Reshmi Churi (Written by Mukunda Das; sung by Sabitabrata Dutta)

5. Lag Lag Ranger Bhelki (Written by Gauriprasanna Mazumder; composed and sung by Hemanta Mukherjee)

6. Malay Asiya Koye Gechhe (Written and composed by Dwijendralal Ray; sung by Robin Banerjee)

7. Suk Bole Keno Shari(Written by Gauriprasanna Mazumder; composed by Hemanta Mukherjee; sung by Hemanta Mukherjee and Bela Mukherjee)

References

External links 
 

1967 films
Bengali-language Indian films
Films directed by Tarun Majumdar
Films scored by Hemant Kumar
Child marriage in India
Bengali films remade in other languages
1960s Bengali-language films